GOCE means Gravity Field and Steady-State Ocean Circulation Explorer

GOCE or Goce may also refer to:

People
Goce Georgievski (born 1987), Macedonian handball player
Goce Nikolovski (1947-2006), Macedonian singer
Goce Sedloski (born 1974), Macedonian retired footballer
Goce Smilevski (born 1975), Macedonian writer
Goce Toleski (born 1977), football player

Other

 Goce, an opera composed by Kiril Makedonski
 WP:GOCE, WikiProject Guild of Copy Editors; an internal collaborative project on Wikipedia.